The T.C. McRae House is a historic house at 506 East Elm Street in Prescott, Arkansas.  This -story wood-frame house was designed by Charles L. Thompson and built in 1919.  Its craftsman style includes a shed-roof entry porch with large brackets and exposed rafter ends.  It is one of a number of buildings commissioned from Thompson by the McRae family.

The house was listed on the National Register of Historic Places in 1982.

See also
D.L. McRae House
National Register of Historic Places listings in Nevada County, Arkansas

References

Houses on the National Register of Historic Places in Arkansas
Houses completed in 1919
Houses in Nevada County, Arkansas
National Register of Historic Places in Nevada County, Arkansas
1919 establishments in Arkansas
American Craftsman architecture in Arkansas
Bungalow architecture in Arkansas
Prescott, Arkansas